Campo Grande is a 2015 Brazilian-French drama film directed by Sandra Kogut. The film received a production funding award in 2013 from Agência Nacional do Cinema and enterered production.  The film had its world premiere screening in the Contemporary World Cinema section of the 2015 Toronto International Film Festival.

Production
Sandra Kogut wrote her original script for Campo Grande while spending a year in Berlin. The concept was developed from a scene from the director's first film. In 2013, Campo Grande became the only Brazilian project selected for co-production at the Co-Production Market Berlinale event held in São Paulo.

Cast
 Julia Bernat as Lila
 Rayane do Amaral as Rayne
 Ygor Manoel as Ygor
 Carla Ribas as Regina
 Pedro Pauleey as Danilo

References

External links
 
 Campo Grande at Film Distribution (Paris)

2015 films
2015 drama films
French drama films
Brazilian drama films
2010s Portuguese-language films
2010s French films